Parietales is an order of flowering plants. It is a descriptive botanical name for placentae parietales (parietal placentation) that characterised those plants. Thus it could be used even today (for a taxon above the rank of family). The termination -ales is only coincidentally identical to that appropriate to the rank of order. 

The name was used in several systems, such as (Bentham and Hooker, Engler and Prantl, Melchior), and Wettstein, etc. although more recent systems such as the Cronquist system preferred the name Violales. It persists as the parietal clade of Malpighiales.

References

Bibliography 

 
 

Historically recognized angiosperm orders